Berillia is a genus of ascidian tunicates in the family Styelidae.

Species within the genus Berillia include:
 Berillia boltenioides Brewin, 1952

References

Stolidobranchia
Tunicate genera